Scott Sanderson may refer to:

 Scott Sanderson (baseball) (1956–2019), American baseball pitcher
 Scott Sanderson (American football) (born 1974), former American football offensive lineman
 Scott Sanderson (basketball), former head men's basketball coach at Lipscomb University